Qamaits is a warrior goddess of the indigenous Nuxalk (sometimes called Bella Coola) people of the central coast of British Columbia in Canada.

Qamaits is also the Goddess of the death and the beginning. At the dawn of Time, Qamaits did battle against the giants of the mountains, which were so high that nothing could survive on them. Qamaits, being a ferocious warrior, defeated legions of giants and turned them into the mountain landscapes of today, knocking them down to the size they are today.  After that she grew bored of Earth and left for residence elsewhere. Her assistant Senx tends to look after the daily tasks of creation.

She doesn't think much of humans and rarely visits the earth, but when she does, she causes earthquakes, forest fires, and sickness. Sometimes she visits to take her pet snake Sisiutl and to attack a few humans about and cause disasters. Her snake is a sign that she is coming.

She is also referred to as World-mother, Our Woman and Afraid-of-Nothing.

References

 
Retrieved: 19 May 2015
 
Retrieved: 19 May 2015

Goddesses of the indigenous peoples of North America
War goddesses
Nuxalk
Nuxalk goddesses